The 2019 RFL 1895 Cup, known as the 2019 AB Sundecks 1895 Cup for sponsorship reasons, is the inaugural tournament for the RFL 1895 Cup, a rugby league football competition for clubs in the United Kingdom. The tournament was played between League 1 and Championship teams  between May and August 2019. The format of the tournament was confirmed in December 2018, and consisted of five rounds. In round 1 eight League 1 teams played in a knock out round. Round 2 introduced the 12 English teams from the Championship who with the winners from round 1 will play eight ties. The quarter-finals and semi-finals followed in June and July, with the final played at Wembley Stadium on 24 August, with the Challenge Cup final also being played on this day.

The competition commenced in May without sponsorship but in June it was announced that the cup would be sponsored by AB Sundecks, owned by former Leigh Centurions chairman Derek Beaumont.

Teams 
The teams participating in the inaugural 1895 Cup are as follows:

League 1
  Doncaster R.L.F.C. 
  Hunslet R.L.F.C. 
  Keighley Cougars 
  Newcastle Thunder 
  Oldham R.L.F.C. 
  West Wales Raiders 
  Whitehaven R.L.F.C. 
  Workington Town 

As some of the games in the later stages were scheduled for midweek, Coventry Bears, London Skolars and North Wales Crusaders decided against entering the competition for logistical reasons.

Championship
  Barrow Raiders 
  Batley Bulldogs
  Bradford Bulls
  Dewsbury Rams 
  Featherstone Rovers 
  Halifax R.L.F.C. 
  Leigh Centurions 
  Rochdale Hornets 
  Sheffield Eagles
  Swinton Lions 
  Widnes Vikings
  York City Knights 

Toulouse Olympique and Toronto Wolfpack were ineligible to enter the competition as the clubs are not full members of the Rugby Football League.

First round  
The first round ties were played on 4–5 May. The draw was made at Odsal Stadium on 12 March immediately after the draw for the fourth round of the Challenge Cup.  The tie between Hunslet and Workington was streamed live on the RFL's OurLeague app.

Second round 
The second round was played between 2–5 June. The draw was made on 5 May.

Quarter-finals 
The quarter-finals were played during the week starting June 24.

Semi-finals 
The semi-finals were played on Sunday 28 July.

Final 
The final was played at Wembley Stadium on 24 August.  Sheffield Eagles beat Widnes Vikings 36–18 after being 12–18 down at half-time.  The inaugural winner of the Ray French Award was Sheffield's Anthony Thackeray.

References 

2019 in English rugby league
RFL 1895 Cup
Rugby league competitions in the United Kingdom
2019 in Welsh rugby league